I 4 monaci (also I quattro monaci), internationally released as The Four Monks, is a 1962 Italian comedy film directed by Carlo Ludovico Bragaglia.

Plot 
A group of four petty criminals, hoping to collect some money as a donation, masquerade as refugees monks from Hungary, however, they end up in a convent where they experience fasting and penance.

Cast 
Peppino De Filippo as Fra' Crispino
Aldo Fabrizi as Fra' Giocondo
Erminio Macario as Fra' Martino
Nino Taranto as Fra' Gaudenzio
Umberto Spadaro as Ortolan
Luciana Gilli as Daughter
Roland Bartrop as The Prior
Nino Terzo as Calogero
Linda Sini as The pharmacist's wife
Carlo Taranto as Mafioso Saruzzo Messina
Franco Ressel as Baron Cimino
Lidia Martora as Baroness Cimino
Enzo Petito as Guardiano

References

External links

1962 films
Films directed by Carlo Ludovico Bragaglia
Italian comedy films
1962 comedy films
1960s Italian films